The Raisin Bowl was an annual post-season American college football bowl game played at Ratcliffe Stadium in Fresno, California, from 1946 to 1949.  The first four games were played on January 1, the last on December 31.  The games pitted a California team against an at-large team; the California team prevailed in four of the five games.

This game is not to be confused with the California Bowl which was later staged in Fresno, which in its later years was marketed as the California Raisin Bowl due to the sale of naming rights to the California Raisin Marketing Board.

Game results

References

See also
 List of college bowl games

 
Defunct college football bowls